Gerald R. Shields (1927 – November 10, 2005) was a librarian, editor, cartoonist and educator.

Shields retired as Assistant Dean of the School of Information and Library Studies at the State University of New York at Buffalo.

Education
Shields received a master of arts in library science from the University of Wisconsin.

Career
Shields was the editor of feature articles in Public Libraries, the journal of the Public Library Association. He served twelve years on the American Library Association (ALA) Council and was chair of the Professional Ethics Committee. He was the founding editor of American Libraries (1968-1973) and the Ohio Library Association Bulletin. He also drew cartoons under the name Jerrybilt.

Awards
1984 New York Library Association's Intellectual Freedom Award.

Bibliography
The FBI Creates An Awareness of Librarian Ethics: An Opinionated Historical (Allerton Park Institute, 1989)  Review  
Librarianship: The New Alternatives and the Old Bundle of Tricks  Library Trends 32 (3) Winter 1984. pages 349-356 
 Freedom of access to library materials, with 	John S. Robotham (Neal-Schuman, 1982) 
Children's Library Services: School or public? (Rowman & Littlefield, 1974)  
 Budgeting for accountability in libraries; a selection of readings with John Gordon Burke (Scarecrow Press, 1974)

References

American librarians
American Library Association people
1927 births
2005 deaths
 University of Wisconsin–Madison School of Library and Information Studies alumni
University at Buffalo faculty